In the various game settings of Palladium Books, Alien Intelligences are fictional, vastly powerful beings of unknown origin that are stated to be a combination of equal parts spirit, magical energy, and physical flesh. They are said to exist on different planes of existence simultaneously, and in the Palladium hierarchy of powers, most Alien Intelligences, apart from the Vampire Intelligences, are more powerful than the mightiest Gods in Palladium. In fact, some of the most powerful Gods of the Palladium Megaverse were themselves spawned by the Alien Intelligences.

Morality in Alien Intelligences
Alien Intelligences are perceived by the vast majority of sentient beings everywhere in the Megaverse as creatures of pure evil intent, and with good reason. While many (perhaps most) Alien Intelligences do indeed gain a great deal of amusement from the suffering of other beings, for the vast majority of Intelligences, the simple fact of the matter is that they consider themselves as far above most sentient beings as those sentient beings consider themselves above pets and livestock, and treat those beings as such. Even Gods, Angels, Demons, and lesser Alien Intelligences are potentially susceptible to being treated as nothing more than pawns, slaves, and in some cases, food.

Types of Alien Intelligences

"Generic" Alien Intelligences
Most Alien Intelligences follow the standard template: a fleshy mound that may or may not take any recognizable shape, a single eye in the middle of the mass of flesh (although there can be hundreds or even thousands of these; most Intelligences don't actually need these eyes to see), and in many cases, a series of tentacles protruding from the Main Body. "Generic" Alien Intelligences have the ability to possess the bodies of "willing" hosts (in most cases any essence fragment that is taken into a host body will forever destroy or consume the original personality and/or soul of anyone tricked into accepting such a deal), the raising, controlling, and/or turning of large numbers of dead, most of the standard abilities of Palladium Gods, and the ability to send out a limited number of essence fragments to better interact with the physical world around them-although these fragments must merge with physical matter in order to be of any use.

Vampire Intelligences
In the Palladium Megaverse, Vampire Intelligences are seemingly the most numerous of their kind, and potentially the most dangerous, especially with the fall of the Old Ones that kept them in check. They are actually minor Old Ones but were deemed too "weak" in comparison to the other Old Ones and were not included in the super-spell that put the Old Ones and many of the greater Intelligences to sleep. Due to the virulent nature of their existence and the universal hatred throughout the Megaverse of vampiric infestation, Vampire Intelligences are hated by almost every sentient being in the Megaverse, from the least to the most powerful, and from the most stalwart Champions of Light to the most evil Devils and Demons. Very, very rarely does any other creature ever willingly work with or for them.

Vampire Intelligences are notable amongst Alien Intelligences in that they can produce an unlimited number of essences (which fuses with a mortal, living creature to form a Vampire), and that the essence fragments can, if so desired, create a corporeal servant-a last line of defense within the Vampire Intelligence's lair-without the need to possess a living victim (most essence fragments are intangible in form and must bond to a solid body in order to interact with the physical world in any way). Vampire Intelligences are, however, much weaker than their brethren in terms of both mystic might and damage capacity.

Elemental Intelligences
Most if not all Greater Elementals summoned by Warlocks, Shifters, and Elemental Fusionists (a name that some Warlocks prefer to be called by), are actually fragments of Elemental Intelligences themselves.

Elemental Intelligences are noteworthy amongst Intelligences, and most sentient life in general, in that they have absolutely no comprehension of morality, one way or the other. Elemental Intelligences cannot comprehend most human emotions-apart from anger-and never ever engage in any activity, good or evil, for pleasure. An Elemental Intelligence, asked or commanded by another being to retrieve an object from point B, will start from point A and simply tear through a village of women and children without the slightest regret: it cannot comprehend why it is "wrong" to kill the innocent, and it has no comprehension of life or death, good or evil.

To date, no Elemental Intelligence has been given stats in Palladium Canon, but their essence fragments are moderately powered by Alien Intelligence standards. This might indicate that the powers of Elemental Intelligences rival or exceed those of their brethren.

Zllyphan
A "sub-species" of Alien Intelligences whose essence fragments can only bond with the now-soulless bodies of the recently deceased. Despite that limitation, there is no apparent limit to the number of bodies that they can reanimate in this manner, the bodies themselves are restored to the appearance of full health and vigor, and furthermore any and all of those bodies are for all intents and purposes that of the Intelligence itself; everything that they see or hear the Main Body of the Intelligence sees and hears also.

Currently in Rifts Earth, on the land once known as British Isles, a Zllyphan named Zazshan has successfully re-created the legend of the Knights of the Round Table; his essence fragments are simultaneously masquerading as the Lady Guinevere, the Sorcerer Merlin, a cadre of the inner circle of Knights, and even as the Lady of the Lake-all of whom seemingly act on their own separate "agendas". Zllyphan are relatively low-powered for Alien Intelligences (although still considerably more powerful than Vampire Intelligences).

Splugorth
The most successful and well-organized of the Alien Intelligences, this sub-species of Alien Intelligences follow the "generic" template for Intelligences in every way, including massive damage capacity (surpassing that of all but the most powerful of Gods), the ability to send out a limited number of essence fragments, create Witches (which they typically and almost exclusively do in the form of the Splugorth High Lords), and host of other capabilities. As a species, their might is exceeded only by that of unique Intelligences such as Apsu, Nxla, and the Lord of the Deep. The Splugorth are confined principally to the Rifts Game Setting, and their past relationship of these creatures to the dreaded Old Ones, if any, is unknown.

Unique/Greater Alien Intelligences
There are one-of-a-kind Intelligences in the Palladium Megaverse that dwarf the power of the Gods and even most other Intelligences. Fortunately for the Megaverse, these beings are few and far between, and they are generally hated and plotted against even by other powerful Intelligences, if for no other reason than that these Greater Intelligences would likely enslave or destroy the lesser ones.

These beings include but are not limited to: Cronus, Nxla, the Lord of the Deep, Apsu, Tikilik, the Rainbow Serpent, the Tarnow Crystal Intelligence (implied to have been imprisoned in the crystal as a punishment by the Old Ones themselves), Devy'Orhal, the Conqueror, Zurvan, and the Dweller Beneath.

The Old Ones
The most powerful of all Alien Intelligences, the Old Ones were the creators of the "science" of magic, the inventors of Rune Wizardry, and possess the same standard abilities of most Intelligences, only on a far greater level (they each have millions of points of Mega Damage Capacity, for example).

It took the combined martial and mystic might of thousands of races and billions of sentient beings throughout the Megaverse to defeat them....and the effort might have failed even then had not one of the Old Ones' number been present to cast the super-spell that put them to sleep. They could not be destroyed, for fear that the resulting magical backlash would destroy all creation.

Powers and abilities
Alien Intelligences can, for the most part, enjoy many of the powers and abilities of Gods, including but not limited to Deific Perception (the ability to tell what manner of creature another being is just by looking at it, no matter what disguise it currently wears), effortless inter-Dimensional teleportation, the summoning of attendant minions from anywhere in the Megaverse to do its bidding, and a wide range of other Prototypical Deific powers. Unlike Gods, however, Alien Intelligences don't need the worship of sentient beings in order to continue to exist.

Most Intelligences can grant powers to favored minions through Witchery pacts as Gods can: in return for varying degrees of servitude, Intelligences can grant these Witches the ability to cast magic, can vastly increase the physical strength and ability of these minions to withstand physical damage, and in a few select cases the Intelligences can grant a longer life span or even immortality to these loyal servants.

One of the Intelligences' most significant abilities, however, is their capability to splinter the essence of their being into multiple Essence Fragments; these fragments are not just a piece of the Intelligence that spawned it, they actually are the Intelligence itself; everything that these fragments ever see or do, the Intelligence sees and does. The amount of essence fragments that a given Intelligence can dispatch at one time are limited by the "species" of Intelligence, although some special types of Intelligences such as the Vampire Intelligences, the Zllyphan Intelligences, and unique Intelligences like Nxla can create a potentially unlimited number of these.

Weaknesses
For all their vast range of powers, Alien Intelligences have weaknesses all their own.

Physically, they cannot alter their form to create a seemingly more fair appearance to mortals, as Gods can do: they have to possess the bodies of other sentient beings to walk among them, and some Intelligences are incapable of even that. They also cannot, for the most part, see through the eyes of their worshippers as Gods can, nor do they possess the unique ability of Palladium Gods to create viable offspring with other lifeforms (in fact, Alien Intelligences cannot reproduce sexually with other species at all).

Alien Intelligences seem to reproduce very slowly, if "reproduction" is the proper term to use at all; some Intelligences in canon, such as the ruler of Rifts Atlantis known as Splynncryth, are given an age which implies a date of origin or birth, but the means by which the Intelligences replenish their numbers remains an unknown at present. In any event, it appears to be a slow process: in Palladium Books canon, less than a hundred or so Alien Intelligences are cited throughout the entire Megaverse, and the fear and hatred of these beings makes them prime targets for revenge, treachery, and even assassination-often at the hands of other, rival Intelligences.

Arguably, their greatest weakness, however, is not physical but mental. In holding "lesser" creatures in such low regard, Alien Intelligences frequently underestimate the ingenuity of the sentient pets, slaves, and livestock below them, and have on more than one occasion been defeated and even destroyed at the hands of an unanticipated insurrection against their rule. Even the Old Ones themselves, far and away the mightiest beings ever to exist in the Palladium Megaverse, were lulled into a false sense of security, and were eventually defeated by a Megaversal uprising that they never expected. Furthermore, many of those participating in the rebellion were their trusted minions.

References

Palladium Fantasy 
Dragons and Gods
The Old Ones

Rifts 
Conversion Book One (Revised)
Conversion Book Two: Pantheons of the Megaverse
Dimension Book Three: Phase World Sourcebook
Mercenaries
Sourcebook Three: Mindwerks
World Book One: Vampire Kingdoms
World Book Two: Atlantis
World Book Three: England
World Book Four: Africa
World Book Twelve: Psyscape
World Book Nineteen: Australia

Fictional extraterrestrial life forms
Megaverse (Palladium Books)